The Yip Yips (also known as the Martians or Aliens) are characters on the American educational children's television show Sesame Street. They are puppets depicting alien visitors from Mars. with notable physical features such as squid-like tentacles, large eyes, and antennae. Built by Caroly Wilcox, they are "Yip Yipped" by multiple Muppeteers including Jim Henson, Jerry Nelson, Richard Hunt, Martin P. Robinson, and Kevin Clash. The puppets have a very simple design, controlled entirely by two rods (one for the body and eyes, the other for the front of the mouth). This allows their entire bodies to be seen on camera, appearing to float in the air.

The Yip Yips appear by materialising into a room, always saying "Yip-yip-yip-yip... Uh-huh" upon arrival. As they come across common objects they are foreign to them, the Yip Yips consult a book they call "Earth book". When they fail to 'correctly' interact with an object of Earth even after consulting their book, they are known to say "nope nope nope". Another common trait of the Yip Yips is that when frightened, they cover their face with the lower part of their jaw while making a "goom" noise.

Skits
 1972: Phone discovery by the Yip Yips 
 1972: Grandfather clock discovery by the Yip Yips
 1978: Ernie wakes up and is unable to find Bert. Ernie imagines that the Martians appeared in the middle of the night and asked Bert to join them in outer space. Bert then enters the room and informs Ernie that he was only in the kitchen making oatmeal. Bert leaves the room and the Martians appear in exactly the way that Ernie had imagined. When Ernie yells to Bert asking what they should do about the visitors, Bert does not believe his story and replies, "Ask them if they want any oatmeal," to which they enthusiastically agree.
 1979: Radio discovery by the Yip Yips
 1986: Luis walks away from his computer briefly, and the Yip Yips visit during that time and experiment with pressing buttons on the computer. Luis comes back to find that his computer has been changed by someone. Later in the show, the Yip Yips come back and leave a flower on the keyboard, which Luis discovers.
 1987: A Yip Yip contributes its voice to the Old MacDonald Cantata along with three Honkers, a Dinger, and Oscar's pet elephant Fluffy.
 1988: The Yip Yips observe Luis and Maria in love.
 1988: with Kermit, Old MacDonald, various farm animals and the Yip Yips, on a "News Flash" from Old MacDonald's Farm. The Yip Yips arrive in a spaceship.
 1988: As contestants of the Guy Smiley game show, Bring That Thing. Guy Smiley addresses them as "Stevie and Jonathan Martian". They need to find three things that involve light. The things that they find are a flashlight, a lamp and the moon. They won a jar of fireflies.
 1988: Visual appearance in "Brush Brush Boogie" sung by the Shagri-Las, had Maria brushing her hair, someone else using a brush, and the Yip Yips brushing their teeth, though they did not speak.
 1989: "Get Along", a song with Kermit, a cow, the Yip Yips, Twiddlebugs and Greasers
 1989: "Family" song with the Yip Yips
 1990: Stars, moon, pigs, Earth discovery by the Yip Yips
 1990: Book discovery by the Yip Yips
 1992: Faucet discovery by the Yip Yips
 1994: On Sesame Street: 25 Wonderful Years, the Yip Yips audition for Big Bird, then go back to "stars".
 1995: Wind discovery by the Yip Yips, from a fan
 1996: "Outerspace Friend", a song by Telly with the Yip Yips
 1998: The Yip Yips join several cast members in a limo in the special Elmopalooza.
 2002: In the recurring skit "Journey to Ernie", Big Bird found himself in outer space, where he was helped by a Yip Yip in his search for Ernie.
 2012: Elmo delivers a pizza box to three Yip Yips on Mars.
 2020: In a story being told by Samuel and Julia
 Unknown: Toaster discovery by the Yip Yips

Merchandising
Around the time of Sesame Streets 35th anniversary, licensors finally started to notice and recall the characters. In mid-to-late 2003, Hot Topic led the way with the first-known official Yip Yip merchandising, a "vintage"-look T-shirt with two Martians. This was followed in the fall of 2004 with Gund bean-bag toys. Light switch plates, action figures (by Palisades Toys), and stuffed toys followed. The 2006 Sesame Street calendar features the Yip Yips for November, and they make an appearance on the front cover. Costumes of the characters may be purchased, but these may not be authorized by Sesame Street.

The only real acknowledgement of the characters previous to 2003 was their mention in the 30th anniversary book Sesame Street Unpaved.

References

External links
 
 Yahoo Groups: The Yip Yip Club
 YouTube Video: Yip Yips discover a telephone
 YouTube Video: Yip Yips discover a radio

Fictional extraterrestrial life forms
Sesame Street Muppet characters
Television characters introduced in 1972